is a former Japanese football player and manager He is the current manager J2 League club of Vegalta Sendai.

Playing career
Ito was born in Niiza on September 19, 1972. After graduating from Kokushikan University, he joined Japan Football League club Fujitsu (later Kawasaki Frontale) in 1995. He played many matches as offensive midfielder and forward from first season. Although his opportunity to play decreased in 1997, he became a regular player in 1998 and the club was promoted to J2 League from 1999. In 1999, the club won the champions and was promoted to J1 League from 2000. In 2000, although the club gained many players and his opportunity to play decreased, the club won the 2nd place J.League Cup. However the club results were bad in league competition and the club was relegated to J2 in a year. Although he played many matches as regular player in 2001, he was released from the club end of 2001 season. In 2002, he moved to J2 club Omiya Ardija in based in his local Saitama Prefecture. He played many matches as regular player in 2 seasons. In 2004, he moved to J2 club Sagan Tosu and played many matches as side midfielder. In 2005, he moved to newly was promoted to J2 League club, Tokushima Vortis. He played many matches as side midfielder in 2 seasons and retired end of 2006 season.

Coaching career
After retirement, Ito started coaching career at Omiya Ardija in 2007. He coached for youth team until 2015. In 2016, he became a top team coach under manager Hiroki Shibuya. In May 2017, the club results were bad and Shibuya was sacked and Ito became a new manager as Shibuya successor. However the club result did not improve and Ito was sacked in November. In 2018, he signed with Ventforet Kofu and became a coach. In 2019, he became a manager.

Club statistics

Managerial statistics

• Statistics including J1 and J2 Leagues, J. League Cup and The Emperor's Cup results.

References

External links
 
 

1972 births
Living people
Kokushikan University alumni
Association football people from Saitama Prefecture
Japanese footballers
J1 League players
J2 League players
Japan Football League (1992–1998) players
Kawasaki Frontale players
Omiya Ardija players
Sagan Tosu players
Tokushima Vortis players
Japanese football managers
J1 League managers
J2 League managers
Omiya Ardija managers
Ventforet Kofu managers
Júbilo Iwata managers
Vegalta Sendai managers
Association football midfielders